Prolog++ is an object-oriented toolkit for the Prolog logic programming language. It allows classes and class hierarchies to be created within Prolog programs.

Prolog++ was developed by LPA and first released in 1989 for MS-DOS PCs. Support for other platforms was added, and a second version was released in 1995. A book entitled 'Prolog++ The Power of Object-Oriented and Logic Programming' by Chris Moss was published by Addison-Wesley in 1994.

Currently, Prolog++ is available as an add-on to LPA Prolog for Windows.

Three other approaches to object-oriented Prolog include PDC Visual Prolog (once known as Borland Turbo Prolog), SICStus Prolog and the almost implementation-neutral Logtalk framework.

See also
 Logtalk
 Visual Prolog

References
 Chris Moss, Prolog++: The Power of Object-Oriented and Logic Programming

External links
 Prolog++ toolkit, the Logic Programming Associates page.
 Prolog++ in the Free On-line Dictionary of Computing

Object-oriented programming languages
Prolog programming language family
Logic programming languages